The Tule River, also called Rio de San Pedro or Rio San Pedro, is a  river in Tulare County in the U.S. state of California. The river originates in the Sierra Nevada east of Porterville and consists of three forks, North, Middle and South. The North Fork and Middle Fork meet above Springville. The South Fork meets the others at Lake Success. Downstream of Success Dam, the river flows west through Porterville. The river used to empty into Tulare Lake, but its waters have been diverted for irrigation. However, the river does reach Tulare Lake during floods.  Tulare Lake is the terminal sink of an endorheic basin that historically also received the Kaweah and Kern Rivers as well as southern distributaries of the Kings.

History
The Yaudanchi, also called Nutaa, of the Yokuts peoples held Tule River in the foothills, especially the North and Middle Forks.

The Tule River is named for a common bulrush or cattail known as "tule". The present Tule River was named Rio de San Pedro by Moraga's expedition in 1806. On Derby's map of 1850 it appears as Tule River or Rio San Pedro.

Course

North Fork
It plunges southwest down a canyon in the Giant Sequoia National Monument, then is joined at the same time by Kramer Creek and Backbone Creek as it enters a broader and less inclined valley. At Milo, the river turns southeast and parallels the Springville-Milo Road. Sycamore and Whitney Creeks join the river from the east and west, respectively, before it meets the Middle Fork at Springville.

Middle Fork
The  Middle Fork is formed by the confluence of the short South Fork Middle Fork Tule River and the North Fork Middle Fork Tule River. The South Fork flows northwest and west, paralleling California State Route 190, from its headwaters near Camp Nelson. The larger North Fork flows south from inside Sequoia National Park, plunges over North Fork of the Middle Fork of the Tule River Falls, and flows southwest to join the South Fork. After the confluence of the North and South forks, the Middle Fork Tule River flows more or less south and southwest, parallel to State Route 190, to join the North Fork and form the Tule River.

South Fork
The  South Fork Tule River joins the main Tule at Lake Success. Formed by the confluence of Blue Creek, Rocky Creek, Pigeon Creek and Bond Creek near Soda Springs, the river winds west-southwest through a narrow canyon. It then bends northwest, receiving Long Branch Creek from the left and Crew Creek from the right. It then forms an arm of Lake Success, which is crossed by State Route 190.

Mainstem
Before emptying into the lake, it is joined by Campbell Creek from the north, and Graham Creek from the east. The South Fork of the Tule River joins the river in Lake Success. The river then exits the Success Dam and flows west into Porterville, and winds west to the former bed of Tulare Lake. It passes the cities of Tipton and Corcoran, and splits into many channels, eventually disappearing into multiple agricultural irrigation and drainage channels.

References
The Tule River

External links

Rivers of the Sierra Nevada (United States)
Rivers of Tulare County, California
Tulare Basin watershed
Geography of the San Joaquin Valley
Rivers of Northern California
Rivers of the Sierra Nevada in California